The 2022 Kansas City Royals season was the 54th season for the franchise, and their 50th at Kauffman Stadium. 

On December 2, 2021, Commissioner of Baseball Rob Manfred announced a lockout of players, following expiration of the collective bargaining agreement (CBA) between the league and the Major League Baseball Players Association (MLBPA). On March 10, 2022, the MLB and MLBPA agreed to a new collective bargaining agreement, thus ending the lockout. Opening Day was played on April 7. Although MLB previously announced that several series would be cancelled due to the lockout, the agreement provides for a 162-game season, with originally canceled games to be made up via doubleheaders.

On September 13, the Royals were officially eliminated from playoff contention for the sixth consecutive season.

Overall, the team finished with a 65–97 record, landing them in last place in the American League Central.

Offseason

Lockout 

The expiration of the league's collective bargaining agreement (CBA) with the Major League Baseball Players Association occurred on December 1, 2021 with no new agreement in place. As a result, the team owners voted unanimously to lockout the players stopping all free agency and trades. 

The parties came to an agreement on a new CBA on March 10, 2022.

Rule changes 
Pursuant to the new CBA, several new rules were instituted for the 2022 season. The National League will adopt the designated hitter full-time, a draft lottery will be implemented, the postseason will expand from ten teams to twelve, and advertising patches will appear on player uniforms and helmets for the first time.

Roster

Regular season

American League Central

American League Wild Card

Game Log

|- style="background:#bfb;" 
| 1 || April 7 || Guardians || 3–1 || Barlow (1–0) || McKenzie (0–1) || — || Kauffman Stadium || 28,459 || 1–0 || W1
|- style="background:#bfb;" 
| 2 || April 9 || Guardians || 1–0  || Snider (1–0) || Clase (0–1) || — || Kauffman Stadium || 17,103 || 2–0 || W2
|- style="background:#fbb;"
| 3 || April 10 || Guardians || 3–17 || Quantrill (1–0) || Bubic (0–1) || — || Kauffman Stadium || 20,165 || 2–1 || L1
|- style="background:#fbb;"
| 4 || April 11 || Guardians || 7–10 || Allen (1–0) || Brentz (0–1) || — || Kauffman Stadium || 8,971 || 2–2 || L2
|- style="background:#fbb;" 
| 5 || April 12 || @ Cardinals || 5–6 || Hicks (1–0) || Lynch (0–1) || Gallegos (1) || Busch Stadium || 40,398 || 2–3 || L3
|- style="background:#bbb;" 
| — || April 13 || @ Cardinals || colspan=8| PPD, RAIN; rescheduled for MAY 2
|- style="background:#fbb;" 
| 6 || April 14 || Tigers || 2–4 || Jiménez (1–0) || Brentz (0–1) || Soto (2) || Kauffman Stadium || 9,595 || 2–4 || L4
|- style="background:#fbb;"
| 7 || April 15 || Tigers || 1–2 || Barnes (1–0) || Keller (0–1) || Fulmer (1) || Kauffman Stadium || 16,720 || 2–5 || L5
|- style="background:#bfb;" 
| 8 || April 16 || Tigers || 3–1 || Snider (1–0) || Vest (0–1) || Staumont (1) || Kauffman Stadium || 19,022 || 3–5 || W1
|- style="background:#bbb;" 
| — || April 17 || Tigers || colspan=8| PPD, RAIN; rescheduled for JULY 11
|- style="background:#bfb;" 
| 9 || April 19 || Twins || 4–3 || Garrett (1–0) || Duffey (0–2) || Staumont (2) || Kauffman Stadium || 10,303 || 4–5 || W2
|- style="background:#bfb;"
| 10 || April 20 || Twins || 2–0 || Lynch (1–1) || Paddack (0–2) || Barlow (1) || Kauffman Stadium || 8,969 || 5–5 || W3
|- style="background:#fbb;" 
| 11 || April 21 || Twins || 0–1 || Ryan (2–1) || Greinke (0–1) || Pagán (1) || Kauffman Stadium || 15,540 || 5–6 || L1
|- style="background:#fbb;" 
| 12 || April 22 || @ Mariners || 1–4 || Flexen (1–2) || Keller (0–2) || Muñoz (1) || T-Mobile Park || 24,206 || 5–7 || L2
|- style="background:#fbb;" 
| 13 || April 23 || @ Mariners || 7–13 || Castillo (1–0) || Brentz (0–3) || — || T-Mobile Park || 28,583 || 5–8 || L3
|- style="background:#fbb;" 
| 14 || April 24 || @ Mariners || 4–5  || Ramírez (1–0) || Payamps (0–1) || — || T-Mobile Park || 28,548 || 5–9 || L4
|- style="background:#bfb;" 
| 15 || April 26 || @ White Sox || 6–0 || Lynch (2–1) || Keuchel (1–2) || — || Guaranteed Rate Field || 12,031 || 6–9 || W1
|- style="background:#fbb;" 
| 16 || April 27 || @ White Sox || 3–7 || Sousa (1–0) || Snider (2–1) || Graveman (1) || Guaranteed Rate Field || 12,363 || 6–10 || L1
|- style="background:#bfb;" 
| 17 || April 28 || @ White Sox || 5–2  || Barlow (2–0) || Bummer (0–1) || Clarke (1) || Guaranteed Rate Field || 11,242 || 7–10 || W1
|- style="background:#fbb;" 
| 18 || April 29 || Yankees || 2–12  || Cortés Jr. (1–0) || Bubic (0–2) || — || Kauffman Stadium || 16,460 || 7–11 || L1
|- style="background:#fbb;" 
| 19 || April 30 || Yankees || 0–3 || Cole (2–0) || Hernández (0–1) || Chapman (5) || Kauffman Stadium || 23,965 || 7–12 || L2
|- 

|- style="background:#fbb;" 
| 20 || May 1 || Yankees || 4–6 || Schmidt (2–2) || Coleman (0–1) || Chapman (6) || Kauffman Stadium || 19,704 || 7–13 || L3
|- style="background:#fbb;"
| 21 || May 2 || @ Cardinals || 0–1 || Matz (3–1) || Greinke (0–2) || Gallegos (5) || Busch Stadium || 33,963 || 7–14 || L4
|- style="background:#bfb;" 
| 22 || May 3 || Cardinals || 7–1 || Keller (1–2) || Hudson (2–2) || — || Kauffman Stadium || 18,788 || 8–14 || W1
|- style="background:#fbb;" 
| 23 || May 4 || Cardinals || 0–10 || Wainwright (3–3) || Bubic (0–3) || — || Kauffman Stadium || 12,774 || 8–15 || L1
|- style="background:#bbb;" 
| — || May 6 || @ Orioles || colspan=8| PPD, RAIN; rescheduled for MAY 8
|- style="background:#bbb;" 
| — || May 7 || @ Orioles || colspan=8| PPD, RAIN; rescheduled for MAY 9
|- style="background:#bfb;" 
| 24 || May 8  || @ Orioles || 6–4 || Clarke (1–0) || López (3–2) || Barlow (2) || Camden Yards ||  || 9–15 || W1
|- style="background:#fbb;" 
| 25 || May 8  || @ Orioles || 2–4 || Zimmermann (2–1) || Lynch (2–2) || Tate (1) || Camden Yards || 19,893 || 9–16 || L1
|- style="background:#fbb;" 
| 26 || May 9 || @ Orioles || 1–6 || Wells (1–2) || Hernández (0–2) || — || Camden Yards || 9,438 || 9–17 || L2
|- style="background:#fbb;" 
| 27 || May 10 || @ Rangers || 4–6 || Pérez (1–2) || Keller (1–3) || Barlow (5) || Globe Life Field || 15,407 || 9–18 || L3
|- style="background:#bfb;" 
| 28 || May 11 || @ Rangers || 8–2 || Payamps (1–0) || Allard (0–2) || — || Globe Life Field || 15,561 || 10–18 || W1
|- style="background:#fbb;" 
| 29 || May 12 || @ Rangers || 1–3 || Hearn (2–2) || Heasley (0–1) || Barlow (6) || Globe Life Field || 14,994 || 10–19 || L1
|- style="background:#bfb;"
| 30 || May 13 || @ Rockies || 14–10 || Coleman (1–1) || Freeland (1–4) || Barlow (3) || Coors Field || 35,176 || 11–19 || W1
|- style="background:#fbb;" 
| 31 || May 14 || @ Rockies || 4–10 || Márquez (1–3) || Hernández (0–3) || — || Coors Field || 40,534 || 11–20 || L1
|- style="background:#bfb;" 
| 32 || May 15 || @ Rockies || 8–7 || Staumont (1–0) || Bard (1–1) || Barlow (4) || Coors Field || 34,505 || 12–20 || W1
|- style="background:#fbb;" 
| 33 || May 16 || White Sox || 3–5  || Burr (1–1) || Barlow (2–1) || Hendriks (10) || Kauffman Stadium || 12,441 || 12–21 || L1
|- style="background:#fbb;" 
| 34 || May 17  || White Sox || 0–3 || Cease (4–1) || Heasley (0–2) || Hendriks (11) || Kauffman Stadium || 9,168 || 12–22 || L2
|- style="background:#bfb;" 
| 35 || May 17  || White Sox || 2–1 || Singer (1–0) || Martin (0–1) || Staumont (3) || Kauffman Stadium || 11,684 || 13–22 || W1
|- style="background:#bfb;" 
| 36 || May 18 || White Sox || 6–2 || Snider (3–1) || López (4–1) || — || Kauffman Stadium || 13,504 || 14–22 || W2
|- style="background:#fbb;" 
| 37 || May 19 || White Sox || 4–7 || Sousa (2–0) || Speier (0–1) || Hendriks (12) || Kauffman Stadium || 11,784 || 14–23 || L1
|- style="background:#fbb;" 
| 38 || May 20 || Twins || 4–6 || Smeltzer (1–0) || Lynch (2–3) || Pagán (6) || Kauffman Stadium || 25,337 || 14–24 || L2
|- style="background:#fbb;" 
| 39 || May 21 || Twins || 2–9 || Ryan (5–2) || Keller (1–4) || — || Kauffman Stadium || 17,893 || 14–25 || L3
|- style="background:#fbb;"
| 40 || May 22 || Twins || 6–7 || Duffey (2–2) || Staumont (1–1) || Durán (3) || Kauffman Stadium || 15,482 || 14–26 || L4
|- style="background:#fbb;" 
| 41 || May 23 || @ Diamondbacks || 5–9 || Wendelken (1–1) || Greinke (0–3) || — || Chase Field || 14,629 || 14–27 || L5
|- style="background:#fbb;" 
| 42 || May 24 || @ Diamondbacks || 6–8 || Mantiply (2–0) || Clarke (1–1) || Melancon (10) || Chase Field || 12,616 || 14–28 || L6
|- style="background:#bfb;" 
| 43 || May 26 || @ Twins || 3–2 || Staumont (2–1) || Duffey (2–3) || Barlow (5) || Target Field || 17,657 || 15–28 || W1
|- style="background:#fbb;" 
| 44 || May 27 || @ Twins || 7–10 || Megill (1–1) || Keller (1–5) || Pagán (7) || Target Field || 21,841 || 15–29 || L1
|- style="background:#bfb;" 
| 45 || May 28 || @ Twins || 7–3 || Singer (2–0) || Archer (0–2) || — || Target Field || 22,249 || 16–29 || W1
|- style="background:#fbb;" 
| 46 || May 29 || @ Twins || 3–7 || Gray (3–1) || Greinke (0–4) || — || Target Field || 27,195 || 16–30 || L1
|- style="background:#fbb;" 
| 47 || May 30 || @ Guardians || 3–7 || Sandlin (4–2) || Snider (3–2) || — || Progressive Field || 15,271 || 16–31 || L2
|- style="background:#fbb;" 
| 48 || May 31 || @ Guardians || 3–8 || Quantrill (2–3) || Lynch (2–4) || — || Progressive Field || 10,519 || 16–32 || L3
|- 

|- style="background:#fbb;" 
| 49 || June 1 || @ Guardians || 0–4 || Pilkington (1–0) || Keller (1–6) || — || Progressive Field || 12,895 || 16–33 || L4
|- style="background:#fbb;" 
| 50 || June 3 || Astros || 3–10 || Urquidy (5–2) || Singer (2–1) || — || Kauffman Stadium || 22,516 || 16–34 || L5
|- style="background:#bfb;" 
| 51 || June 4 || Astros || 6–0 || Snider (4–2) || García (3–4) || — || Kauffman Stadium || 14,663 || 17–34 || W1
|- style="background:#fbb;" 
| 52 || June 5 || Astros || 4–7 || Valdez (6–2) || Heasley (0–3) || Montero (4) || Kauffman Stadium || 12,776 || 17–35 || L1
|- style="background:#fbb;"
| 53 || June 6 || Blue Jays || 0–8 || Stripling (2–1) || Lynch (2–5) || — || Kauffman Stadium || 10,889 || 17–36 || L2
|- style="background:#fbb;" 
| 54 || June 7 || Blue Jays || 0–7 || Manoah (7–1) || Keller (1–7) || — || Kauffman Stadium || 15,103 || 17–37 || L3
|- style="background:#bfb;"
| 55 || June 8 || Blue Jays || 8–4 || Singer (3–1) || Richards (2–1) || — || Kauffman Stadium || 12,196 || 18–37 || W1
|- style="background:#bfb;"
| 56 || June 9 || Orioles || 7–5 || Payamps (2–1) || Lyles (3–5) || Barlow (6) || Kauffman Stadium || 15,594 || 19–37 || W2
|- style="background:#bfb;"
| 57 || June 10 || Orioles || 8–1 || Heasley (1–3) || Zimmermann (2–5) || — || Kauffman Stadium || 17,650 || 20–37 || W3
|- style="background:#fbb;" 
| 58 || June 11 || Orioles || 4–6 || Wells (3–4) || Lynch (2–6) || López (8) || Kauffman Stadium || 15,134 || 20–38 || L1
|- style="background:#fbb;" 
| 59 || June 12 || Orioles || 7–10 || Kremer (1–1) || Keller (1–8) || Pérez (1) || Kauffman Stadium || 15,037 || 20–39 || L2
|- style="background:#fbb;" 
| 60 || June 13 || @ Giants || 2–6 || Wood (4–5) || Garrett (1–1) || — || Oracle Park || 22,185 || 20–40 || L3
|- style="background:#fbb;"
| 61 || June 14 || @ Giants || 2–4 || Webb (6–2) || Bubic (0–4) || Doval (9) || Oracle Park || 24,386 || 20–41 || L4
|- style="background:#bfb;" 
| 62 || June 15 || @ Giants || 3–2 || Cuas (1–0) || Brebbia (3–1) || Barlow (7) || Oracle Park || 25,527 || 21–41 || W1
|- style="background:#bfb;" 
| 63 || June 17 || @ Athletics || 5–1 || Lynch (3–6) || Montas (3–7) || — || Oakland Coliseum || 8,772 || 22–41 || W2
|- style="background:#bfb;" 
| 64 || June 18 || @ Athletics || 2–0 || Keller (2–8) || Irvin (2–4) || Barlow (8) || Oakland Coliseum || 10,936 || 23–41 || W3
|- style="background:#fbb;" 
| 65 || June 19 || @ Athletics || 0–4 || Koenig (1–2) || Singer (3–2) || — || Oakland Coliseum || 14,341 || 23–42 || L1
|- style="background:#bfb;" 
| 66 || June 20 || @ Angels || 6–2 || Bubic (1–4) || Syndergaard (4–6) || — || Angel Stadium || 22,234 || 24–42 || W1
|- style="background:#bfb;" 
| 67 || June 21 || @ Angels || 12–11  || Coleman (2–1) || Quijada (0–2) || Mengden (1) || Angel Stadium || 20,189 || 25–42 || W2
|- style="background:#fbb;" 
| 68 || June 22 || @ Angels || 0–5 || Ohtani (6–2) || Lynch (3–7) || — || Angel Stadium || 34,792 || 25–43 || L1
|- style="background:#bfb;" 
| 69 || June 24 || Athletics || 3–1 || Greinke (1–4) || Irvin (2–5) || Barlow (9) || Kauffman Stadium || 25,077 || 26–43 || W1
|- style="background:#fbb;" 
| 70 || June 25 || Athletics || 7–9 || Jackson (2–2) || Keller (1–9) || Trivino (3) || Kauffman Stadium || 13,543 || 26–44 || L1
|- style="background:#fbb;" 
| 71 || June 26 || Athletics || 3–5 || Moll (3–0) || Singer (3–3) || Trivino (4) || Kauffman Stadium || 24,820 || 26–45 || L2
|- style="background:#fbb;" 
| 72 || June 27 || Rangers || 4–10 || Pérez (6–2) || Bubic (1–5) || — || Kauffman Stadium || 12,876 || 26–46 || L3
|- style="background:#fbb;" 
| 73 || June 28 || Rangers || 3–8 || Gray (4–3) || Heasley (1–4) || — || Kauffman Stadium || 19,593 || 26–47 || L4
|- style="background:#bfb;" 
| 74 || June 29 || Rangers || 2–1 || Greinke (2–4) || Dunning (1–6) || Barlow (10) || Kauffman Stadium || 11,391 || 27–47 || W1
|- 

|- style="background:#bfb;" 
| 75 || July 1 || @ Tigers || 3–1 || Keller (3–9) || Pineda (1–3) || Barlow (11) || Comerica Park || 24,349 || 28–47 || W2
|- style="background:#fbb;" 
| 76 || July 2 || @ Tigers || 3–4 || Jiménez (3–0) || Payamps (2–2) || — || Comerica Park || 23,502 || 28–48 || L1
|- style="background:#bfb;" 
| 77 || July 3 || @ Tigers || 7–4 || Cuas (2–0) || Skubal (5–7) || Barlow (12) || Comerica Park || 21,625 || 29–48 || W1
|- style="background:#fbb;" 
| 78 || July 4 || @ Astros || 6–7 || Stanek (1–0) || Barlow (2–2) || — || Minute Maid Park || 33,936 || 29–49 || L1
|- style="background:#fbb;" 
| 79 || July 5 || @ Astros || 7–9 || García (7–5) || Greinke (2–5) || Montero (6) || Minute Maid Park || 28,762 || 29–50 || L2
|- style="background:#bfb;"
| 80 || July 6 || @ Astros || 7–4 || Keller (4–9) || Javier (6–4) || Barlow (13) || Minute Maid Park || 26,534 || 30–50 || W1
|- style="background:#fbb;" 
| 81 || July 7 || @ Astros || 2–5 || Verlander (11–3) || Bubic (1–6) || Pressly (18) || Minute Maid Park || 36,067 || 30–51 || L1
|- style="background:#bfb;"
| 82 || July 8 || Guardians || 4–3 || Barlow (3–2) || Hentges (2–1) || — || Kauffman Stadium || 19,611 || 31–51 || W1
|- style="background:#fbb;" 
| 83 || July 9 || Guardians || 1–13 || McKenzie (6–6) || Heasley (1–5) || — || Kauffman Stadium || 17,024 || 31–52 || L1
|- style="background:#bfb;"
| 84 || July 10 || Guardians || 5–1 || Greinke (3–5) || Plesac (2–7) || — || Kauffman Stadium || 13,284 || 32–52 || W1
|- style="background:#bfb;"
| 85 || July 11  || Tigers || 3–1 || Keller (5–9) || Pineda (2–4) || Barlow (14) || Kauffman Stadium || 11,084 || 33–52 || W2
|- style="background:#bfb;"
| 86 || July 11  || Tigers || 7–3 || Zerpa (1–0) || Faedo (1–5) || — || Kauffman Stadium || 16,202 || 34–52 || W3
|- style="background:#fbb;" 
| 87 || July 12 || Tigers || 5–7 || Brieske (3–6) || Cuas (2–1) || Soto (18) || Kauffman Stadium || 14,541 || 34–53 || L1
|- style="background:#bfb;" 
| 88 || July 13 || Tigers || 5–2 || Singer (4–3) || Skubal (6–8) || Barlow (15) || Kauffman Stadium || 11,016 || 35–53 || W1
|- style="background:#bfb;"
| 89 || July 14 || @ Blue Jays || 3–1 || Zerpa (2–0) || Gausman (6–7) || Barlow (16) || Rogers Centre || 24,426 || 36–53 || W2
|- style="background:#fbb;"
| 90 || July 15 || @ Blue Jays || 1–8 || Manoah (10–4) || Greinke (3–6) || — || Rogers Centre || 26,422 || 36–54 || L1
|- style="background:#fbb;"
| 91 || July 16 || @ Blue Jays || 5–6  || Romano (3–2) || Payamps (2–3) || — || Rogers Centre || 40,135 || 36–55 || L2
|- style="background:#fbb;"
| 92 || July 17 || @ Blue Jays || 2–4 || Mayza (3–0) || Mills (0–1) || Romano (20) || Rogers Centre || 36,681 || 36–56 || L3
|- style="text-align:center; background:#bbcaff;"
| colspan="11" | 92nd All-Star Game in Los Angeles, California
|- style="background:#fbb;"
| 93 || July 22 || Rays || 3–7 || Rasmussen (6–3) || Keller (5–10) || — || Kauffman Stadium || 22,102 || 36–57 || L4
|- style="background:#bfb;"
| 94 || July 23 || Rays || 6–3 || Barlow (4–2) || Yarbrough (0–5) || — || Kauffman Stadium || 20,668 || 37–57 || W1
|- style="background:#bfb;"
| 95 || July 24 || Rays || 4–2 || Bubic (2–6) || Raley (1–1) || Clarke (2) || Kauffman Stadium || 12,336 || 38–57 || W2
|- style="background:#bfb;" 
| 96 || July 25 || Angels || 7–0 || Garrett (2–1) || Syndergaard (5–8) || — || Kauffman Stadium || 16,616 || 39–57 || W3
|- style="background:#fbb;"
| 97 || July 26 || Angels || 0–6 || Suárez (2–4) || Zerpa (2–1) || — || Kauffman Stadium || 20,834 || 39–58 || L1
|- style="background:#fbb;" 
| 98 || July 27 || Angels || 0–4 || Junk (1–0) || Keller (5–11) || — || Kauffman Stadium || 12,596 || 39–59 || L2
|- style="background:#fbb;"
| 99 || July 28 || @ Yankees || 0–1 || Holmes (5–1) || Barlow (4–3) || — || Yankee Stadium || 43,836 || 39–60 || L3
|- style="background:#fbb;"
| 100 || July 29 || @ Yankees || 5–11 || Abreu (2–0) || Barlow (4–4) || — || Yankee Stadium || 42,481 || 39–61 || L4
|- style="background:#fbb;'
| 101 || July 30 || @ Yankees || 2–8 || Cortés Jr. (9–3) || Heasley (1–6) || Schmidt (2) || Yankee Stadium || 44,081 || 39–62 || L5
|- style="background:#bfb;"
| 102 || July 31 || @ Yankees || 8–6 || Clarke (2–1) || Holmes (5–2) || — || Yankee Stadium || 45,341 || 40–62 || W1
|- 

|- style="background:#bfb;" 
| 103 || August 1 || @ White Sox || 2–1 || Lynch (4–7) || Kopech (4–7) || Barlow (17) || Guaranteed Rate Field || 17,500 || 41–62 || W2
|- style="background:#fbb;"
| 104 || August 2 || @ White Sox || 2–9 || Giolito (7–6) || Keller (5–12) || — || Guaranteed Rate Field || 24,361 || 41–63 || L1
|- style="background:#fbb;"
| 105 || August 3 || @ White Sox || 1–4 || Lynn (2–4) || Singer (4–4) || Hendriks (21) || Guaranteed Rate Field || 19,753 || 41–64 || L2
|- style="background:#bfb;"
| 106 || August 4 || Red Sox || 7–3 || Clarke (3–1) || Hernández (0–1) || — || Kauffman Stadium || 18,970 || 42–64 || W1
|- style="background:#fbb;"
| 107 || August 5 || Red Sox || 4–7 || Winckowski (5–5) || Greinke (3–7) || — || Kauffman Stadium || 21,246 || 42–65 || L1
|- style="background:#bfb;"
| 108 || August 6 || Red Sox || 5–4 || Coleman (3–1) || Whitlock (2–2) || — || Kauffman Stadium || 19,136 || 43–65 || W1
|- style="background:#bfb;"
| 109 || August 7 || Red Sox || 13–5 || Keller (6–12) || Crawford (3–4) || — || Kauffman Stadium || 14,949 || 44–65 || W2
|- style="background:#bfb;"
| 110 || August 9  || White Sox || 4–2 || Singer (5–4) || Lynn (2–5) || Cuas (1) || Kauffman Stadium ||  || 45–65 || W3
|- style="background:#fbb;"
| 111 || August 9  || White Sox || 2–3 || Martin (2–3) || Heasley (1–7) || Hendriks (23) || Kauffman Stadium || 12,700 || 45–66 || L1
|- style="background:#bfb;"
| 112 || August 10 || White Sox || 8–3 || Staumont (3–1) || Diekman (5–2) || — || Kauffman Stadium || 15,463 || 46–66 || W1
|- style="background:#bfb;"
| 113 || August 11 || White Sox || 5–3 || Greinke (4–7) || Cease (12–5) || Barlow (18) || Kauffman Stadium || 10,009 || 47–66 || W2
|- style="background:#fbb;"
| 114 || August 12 || Dodgers || 3–8 || Gonsolin (14–1) || Staumont (3–2) || — || Kauffman Stadium || 24,333 || 47–67 || L1
|- style="background:#fbb;"
| 115 || August 13 || Dodgers || 3–13 || Bickford (2–1) || Keller (6–13) || — || Kauffman Stadium || 29,689 || 47–68 || L2
|- style="background:#bfb;"
| 116 || August 14 || Dodgers || 4–0 || Singer (6–4) || Anderson (13–2) || Barlow (19) || Kauffman Stadium || 18,481 || 48–68 || W1
|- style="background:#fbb;"
| 117 || August 15 || @ Twins || 2–4 || Ryan (9–5) || Bubic (2–7) || López (21) || Target Field || 22,003 || 48–69 || L1
|- style="background:#fbb;"
| 118 || August 16 || @ Twins || 0–9 || Gray (7–3) || Greinke (4–8) || — || Target Field || 23,093 || 48–70 || L2
|- style="background:#fbb;"
| 119 || August 17 || @ Twins || 0–4 || Pagán (4–6) || Lynch (4–8) || — || Target Field || 23,543 || 48–71 || L3
|- style="background:#fbb;"
| 120 || August 18 || @ Rays || 1–7 || Patiño (1–1) || Castillo (0–1) || — || Tropicana Field || 8,169 || 48–72 || L4
|- style="background:#bfb;"
| 121 || August 19 || @ Rays || 3–2  || Barlow (5–4) || Beeks (2–3) || — || Tropicana Field || 10,049 || 49–72 || W1
|- style="background:#fbb;" 
| 122 || August 20 || @ Rays || 2–5 || Rasmussen (8–4) || Bubic (2–8) || Fairbanks (3) || Tropicana Field || 19,800 || 49–73 || L1
|- style="background:#fbb;"
| 123 || August 21 || @ Rays || 2–3 || Armstrong (2–1) || Cuas (2–2) || Fairbanks (4) || Tropicana Field || 12,940 || 49–74 || L2
|- style="background:#bfb;"
| 124 || August 22 || White Sox || 6–4 || Garrett (3–1) || Kelly (1–3) || Barlow (20) || Kauffman Stadium || 8,471 || 50–74 || W1
|- style="background:#fbb;"
| 125 || August 23 || Diamondbacks || 3–7 || Mantiply (2–4) || Staumont (3–3) || — || Kauffman Stadium || 12,427 || 50–75 || L1
|- style="background:#bfb;"
| 126 || August 24 || Diamondbacks || 5–3 || Singer (7–4) || Ramirez (4–4) || — || Kauffman Stadium || 10,531 || 51–75 || W1
|- style="background:#fbb;"
| 127 || August 26 || Padres || 5–13 || Suárez (4–1) || Bubic (2–9) || — || Kauffman Stadium || 16,479 || 51–76 || L1
|- style="background:#fbb;"
| 128 || August 27 || Padres || 3–4 || Darvish (11–7) || Lynch (4–9) || Martinez (6) || Kauffman Stadium || 22,232 || 51–77 || L2
|- style="background:#bfb;"
| 129 || August 28 || Padres || 15–7 || Heasley (2–7) || Manaea (7–7) || — || Kauffman Stadium || 12,584 || 52–77 || W1
|- style="background:#bfb;" 
| 130 || August 30 || @ White Sox || 9–7 || Cuas (3–2) || Giolito (10–8) || — || Guaranteed Rate Field || 17,130 || 53–77 || W2
|- style="background:#fbb;"
| 131 || August 31 || @ White Sox || 2–4 || Lynn (4–5) || Bubic (2–10) || Hendriks (29) || Guaranteed Rate Field || 17,168 || 53–78 || L1
|- 

|- style="background:#fbb;" 
| 132 || September 1 || @ White Sox || 1–7 || Cueto (7–6) || Mengden (0–1) || — || Guaranteed Rate Field || 15,257 || 53–79 || L2
|- style="background:#fbb;"
| 133 || September 2 || @ Tigers || 4–5 || Chafin (1–2) || Hernández (0–4) || Soto (24) || Comerica Park || 16,067 || 53–80 || L3
|- style="background:#bfb;"
| 134 || September 3 || @ Tigers || 12–2 || Heasley (3–7) || Pineda (2–7) || — || Comerica Park || 15,259 || 54–80 || W1
|- style="background:#bfb;"
| 135 || September 4 || @ Tigers || 3–2 || Coleman (4–1) || Soto (2–8) || Barlow (21) || Comerica Park || 15,206 || 55–80 || W2
|- style="background:#fbb;"
| 136 || September 5 || Guardians || 5–6  || Morgan (5–3) || Hernández (0–5) || Clase (31) || Kauffman Stadium || 11,511 || 55–81 || L1
|- style="background:#fbb;"
| 137 || September 6 || Guardians || 1–4 || Bieber (9–8) || Bubic (2–11) || Karinchak (1) || Kauffman Stadium || 12,580 || 55–82 || L2
|- style="background:#bfb;"
| 138 || September 7 || Guardians || 2–1 || Barlow (6−4) || Clase (2−4) || — || Kauffman Stadium || 13,394 || 56–82 || W1
|- style="background:#fbb;"
| 139 || September 9 || Tigers || 2–10 || Wentz (1–1) || Lynch (4–10) || — || Kauffman Stadium || 14,556 || 56–83 || L1
|- style="background:#fbb;"
| 140 || September 10 || Tigers || 4–8  || Manning (2–2) || Heasley (3–8) || — || Kauffman Stadium || 15,929 || 56–84 || L2
|- style="background:#bfb;" 
| 141 || September 11 || Tigers || 4–0 || Singer (8–4) || Alexander (3–10) || — || Kauffman Stadium || 13,150 || 57–84 || W1
|- style="background:#fbb;" 
| 142 || September 13 || @ Twins || 3–6 || Ryan (11–8) || Bubic (2–12) || — || Target Field || 19,005 || 57–85 || L1
|- style="background:#fbb;" 
| 143 || September 14 || @ Twins || 0–4 || Gray (8–4) || Greinke (4–9) || — || Target Field || 14,927 || 57–86 || L2
|- style="background:#fbb;"
| 144 || September 15 || @ Twins || 2–3 || Megill (4–3) || Lynch (4–11) || Durán (7) || Target Field || 16,595 || 57–87 || L3
|- style="background:#fbb;"
| 145 || September 16 || @ Red Sox || 1–2 || Whitlock (4–2) || Coleman (4–2) || Strahm (4) || Fenway Park || 33,181 || 57–88 || L4
|- style="background:#bfb;"
| 146 || September 17 || @ Red Sox || 9–0 || Singer (9–4) || Hill (7–7) || — || Fenway Park || 34,925 || 58–88 || W1
|- style="background:#fbb;" 
| 147 || September 18 || @ Red Sox || 3–13 || Pivetta (10–11) || Bubic (2–13) || — || Fenway Park || 31,199 || 58–89 || L1
|- style="background:#bfb;" 
| 148 || September 20 || Twins || 5–4 || Coleman (5–2) || Fulmer (5–6) || Barlow (22) || Kauffman Stadium || 14,508 || 59–89 || W1
|- style="background:#bfb;" 
| 149 || September 21 || Twins || 5–2 || Misiewicz (1–1) || Ober (1–3) || Barlow (23) || Kauffman Stadium || 13,952 || 60–89 || W2
|- style="background:#bfb;" 
| 150 || September 22 || Twins || 4–1 || Heasley (4–8) || Winder (4–5) || Keller (1) || Kauffman Stadium || 12,951 || 61–89 || W3
|- style="background:#bfb;" 
| 151 || September 23 || Mariners || 5–1 || Singer (10–4) || Gonzales (10–15) || — || Kauffman Stadium || 13,615 || 62–89 || W4
|- style="background:#fbb;"
| 152 || September 24 || Mariners || 5–6 || Sewald (5–4) || Keller (6–14) || Muñoz (4) || Kauffman Stadium || 25,237 || 62–90 || L1
|- style="background:#bfb;"
| 153 || September 25 || Mariners || 13–12 || Cuas (4–2) || Brash (3–5) || Barlow (24) || Kauffman Stadium || 18,350 || 63–90 || W1
|- style="background:#fbb;" 
| 154 || September 27 || @ Tigers || 3–4  || Lange (6–4) || Misiewicz (2–2) || — || Comerica Park || 13,334 || 63–91 || L1
|- style="background:#fbb;" 
| 155 || September 28 || @ Tigers || 1–2 || Norris (1–4) || Lynch (4–12) || Soto (29) || Comerica Park || 12,610 || 63–92 || L2
|- style="background:#fbb;" 
| 156 || September 29 || @ Tigers || 3–10 || Rodríguez (5–5) || Heasley (4–9) || — || Comerica Park || 13,137 || 63–93 || L3
|- style="background:#fbb;" 
| 157 || September 30 || @ Guardians || 3–6 || Civale (4–6) || Singer (10–5) || Clase (40) || Progressive Field || 19,753 || 63–94 || L4
|- 

|- style="background:#bfb;"
| 158 || October 1 || @ Guardians || 7–1 || Bubic (3–13) || Plesac (3–12) || — || Progressive Field || 26,982 || 64–94 || W1
|- style="background:#fbb;" 
| 159 || October 2 || @ Guardians || 5–7 || Bieber (13–8) || Castillo (0–2) || Clase (41) || Progressive Field || 20,622 || 64–95 || L1
|- style="background:#bfb;" 
| 160 || October 3 || @ Guardians || 5–2  || Barlow (7–4) || McCarty (4–3) || Clarke (3) || Progressive Field || 18,688 || 65–95 || W1
|- style="background:#fbb;" 
| 161 || October 4 || @ Guardians || 3–5 || Quantrill (15–5) || Lynch (4–13) || Clase (42) || Progressive Field || 19,455 || 65–96 || L1
|- style="background:#fbb;"
| 162 || October 5 || @ Guardians || 2–9 || Civale (5–6) || Heasley (4–10) || — || Progressive Field || 12,983 || 65–97 || L2
|-

|- style="text-align:center;"
| Legend:       = Win       = Loss       = PostponementBold = Royals team member

Statistics

Batting 
(Final Stats)
Players in bold are on the active roster.
Note: G = Games played; AB = At bats; R = Runs; H = Hits; 2B = Doubles; 3B = Triples; HR = Home runs; RBI = Runs batted in; SB = Stolen bases; BB = Walks; K = Strikeouts; Avg. = Batting average; OBP = On-base percentage; SLG = Slugging percentage; TB = Total bases

Source

Pitching 
(Final Stats)
Players in bold are on the active roster.
Note: W = Wins; L = Losses; ERA = Earned run average; WHIP = Walks plus hits per inning pitched; G = Games pitched; GS = Games started; SV = Saves; IP = Innings pitched; H = Hits allowed; R = Runs allowed; ER = Earned runs allowed; BB = Walks allowed; K = Strikeouts

Source

Farm system

References

External links
Kansas City Royals Official Site 
2022 Kansas City Royals at Baseball Reference

Kansas City Royals
Kansas City Royals seasons
Kansas City Royals